Automatic block signaling (ABS), spelled automatic block signalling or called track circuit block (TCB) in the UK, is a railroad communications system that consists of a series of signals that divide a railway line into a series of sections, called blocks. The system controls the movement of trains between the blocks using automatic signals. ABS operation is designed to allow trains operating in the same direction to follow each other in a safe manner without risk of rear-end collision.

The introduction of ABS reduced railways' costs and increased their capacity. Older manual block systems required human operators. The automatic operation comes from the system's ability to detect whether blocks are occupied or otherwise obstructed, and to convey that information to approaching trains. The system operates without any outside intervention, unlike more modern traffic control systems that require external control to establish a flow of traffic.

History 
The earliest way of managing multiple trains on one track was by use of a timetable and passing sidings. One train waited upon another, according to the instructions in the timetable, but if a train was delayed for any reason, all other trains might be delayed, waiting for it to appear at the proper place where they could pass safely. Operation of trains by timetable alone was supplemented by telegraphed train orders beginning in 1854 on the Erie Railroad. A railroad company dispatcher would send train orders to stations manned by telegraphers, who wrote them down on standardized forms and handed them to train crews as they passed the station.

A manual block system in the United States was implemented by the Pennsylvania Railroad about 1863, a couple of decades before other American railroads began using it. This system required a railroad employee stationed at each signal to set the signals according to instructions received by telegraph from dispatchers. English railroads also used a "controlled manual" block system, which was adapted for use in the U.S. by the New York Central and Hudson River Railroad in 1882.

Automatic block signaling was invented in America, and first put to use by the Eastern Railroad of Massachusetts in 1871, and was soon adopted by other New England railroads. However, the cost of signals, equipment, and installation was very high in the 19th century, which deterred many railroads from installing it except on highly trafficked lines used by passenger trains.

Automatic signals have been in use since 1926 in the UK, the first one in the UK was installed in the Wolverhampton area.

However, as time went on, many railroads came to see automatic block signaling as cost effective, since it reduced the need for employees to manually operate each signal, reduced the repair costs and damage claims resulting from collisions, made possible a more efficient flow of trains, reduced the number of hours trains and crews sat idle, and decreased overall transit times from point to point.

Basic operation 
Most ABS systems use three- or four-block arrangements, where an obstruction in the first block will prompt a warning upon entering the second block, and allow full speed for trains entering the third. Where blocks are short or higher capacity is needed, four or more blocks are used; trains are then given multiple warnings of an impending obstruction. For basic block status, the red/yellow/green system of signaling is nearly universal, with red indicating an obstructed block, yellow indicating that an obstructed block is ahead, and green indicating that no obstruction is to be expected.

In the United Kingdom 

In the UK, automatic signals are used where there are no ground frame, flat junctions, railroad switch facing and trailing, manually controlled level crossing, neutral sections, or other interlocking functions. It is standard practice to have an overlap after the signal.

Single-direction ABS 
 	

The most common forms of ABS were implemented on double-track rail lines in high-density areas that exceeded the capacity provided by either timetable and train order or other manual forms of signaling. ABS would be set up in such a way to cover train movements only in a single direction for each track. The movement of trains running in that direction would be governed by the automatic block signals which would supersede the normal superiority of trains, where such systems applied. Movement of trains operating against the established flow of traffic would still require train orders or other special manual protections to prevent a collision.  Therefore, under ABS operation trains moving in the wrong direction incurs additional operational overhead and may not be well supported by the track infrastructure.

See also 
 Absolute block signalling
 Centralized traffic control
 
 Flagman
 
 Track warrant

References

Further reading 
 

1871 establishments in the United States
1871 in rail transport
1871 introductions
Railway signalling block systems